Coeliades bixana, the dark blue policeman, is a butterfly of the family Hesperiidae.

It is found in Guinea, Ivory Coast, Ghana, Nigeria (south), Cameroon, Republic of the Congo, the Central African Republic, Angola and the Democratic Republic of the Congo. Its habitat consists of primary forests.

Larvae feed on Cassia species and Triaspis odorata.

References

Butterflies described in 1940
Coeliadinae